The entanglement of formation is a quantity that measures the entanglement of a bipartite quantum state.

Definition
For a pure bipartite quantum state , using Schmidt decomposition, we see that the reduced density matrices of A and B have the same form . The von Neumann entropy  of the reduced density matrix can be used to measure the entanglement of the state . This is also known as the entanglement of formation of pure state.

For a mixed bipartite state , a natural generalization is to consider all the ensemble realizations of the mixed state.
We can define a quantity by minimizing over all these ensemble realizations,
, where , and the minimization is over all the possible ways in which one can decompose  as a mixture of pure states. This kind of extension of a quantity defined on pure states to mixed states is called a convex roof construction. This quantity is called the entanglement of formation.

Relation with concurrence
The entanglement of formation has a close relationship with concurrence. For a given state , its entanglement of formation  is related to its concurrence :

where  is the Shannon entropy function,

References

Quantum information theory